The Seven Ladders Canyon is a mountainous canyon carved by the Șapte Scări Brook in Romania in the county of Brașov, south of Dâmbul Morii village. It is considered to be one of the main tourist attractions from the Piatra Mare massif. 

The trail within the canyon is arranged with metal stairs and platforms.

7 stairs Canyon, or the "subdivision" of Piatra Mare Mountain miracles, is composed of exactly 7 slope bits illustrating the 7 waterfalls that give the name of the canyon. The 7 steps pass with heights between 2.5 meters and 15 meters turn into cascades when the water volume of the river Seven Stairs increases.

References

Canyons and gorges of Romania
Geography of Brașov County
Tourist attractions in Brașov County